The Ministry of Defense  (MINDEF) of Argentina is a ministry of the national executive power that oversees and advises on matters of national defense, including overseeing the Argentine Armed Forces.

The Ministry of Defense is one of the oldest ministries in the Argentine government, having existed continuously since the formation of the first Argentine executive in 1854, in the presidency of Justo José de Urquiza (then known as the Ministry of War). The incumbent minister is Jorge Taiana, who has served since 10 August 2021 in the cabinet of Alberto Fernández.

History
Traditionally the minister of Defense, as the Joint chiefs of Staff (Spanish: Estado Mayor Conjunto) which traces back its origin to 1948 had a minor role in all armed forces activities, relegating key decisions to the respectives chiefs of staff.

A major change came into effect on 12 June 2006 when President Néstor Kirchner brought into effect the Defense Law, which had been passed in 1988 as a means to modernize the doctrine of the armed forces and define their role, although successive governments had failed to put it into effect.

The law states that the armed forces will only be used against foreign aggression, and reduces the powers of the heads of the armed services, centralizing whole operational and acquisitions decisions under the authority of the minister of Defense through the Armed Forces Joint General Staff emphasizing Jointness

Structure
Estado Mayor Conjunto de las Fuerzas Armadas (EMC): Joint Chiefs of Staff of the Armed Forces
Secretaría de Estrategia y Asuntos Militares: Strategy and Military Affairs Secretary
Secretaría de Planeamiento: Planning Secretary
Secretaría de Asuntos Internacionales de la Defensa: Defense Foreign Affairs Secretary
Dirección Nacional de Inteligencia Estratégica Militar: National Directory for Military Intelligence
Dirección Nacional de Derechos Humanos y el Derecho Internacional Humanitario: National Directory for Human Rights
CITEDEF (former CITEFA)
Industrial Complex: (FMA, Fabricaciones Militares, Tandanor/Domecq Garcia)

List of ministers

See also
Argentine defense industry
Argentine Armed Forces
Defence diplomacy

References

External links
 
 Joint chiefs off Staff
 

 
Defence
Military of Argentina
Argentina